
Gmina Jedwabno is a rural gmina (administrative district) in Szczytno County, Warmian-Masurian Voivodeship, in northern Poland.

Villages
Gmina Jedwabno contains the villages and settlements of Brajniki, Burdąg, Czarny Piec, Dębowiec, Dłużek, Dzierzki, Kot, Lipniki, Małszewo, Narty, Nowe Borowe, Nowy Dwór, Nowy Las, Piduń, Rekownica, Szuć, Waplewo, Warchały, Witówko and Witowo.

Neighbouring gminas
Gmina Jedwabno is bordered by the gminas of Janowo, Nidzica, Olsztynek, Pasym, Purda, Szczytno and Wielbark.

References
 Polish official population figures 2006

Jedwabno
Szczytno County